Stoke Row is a village and civil parish in the Chiltern Hills, about  west of Henley-on-Thames in South Oxfordshire and about  north of Reading. The 2011 Census recorded the parish population as 651.

History
The earliest known surviving record of the name is from 1435. Stoke is a common place-name derived from Old English, typically meaning a secondary settlement or outlying farmstead. With the affix "row" it means a "row of houses at Stoke". Stoke Row was a hamlet divided between the ancient parishes, and later civil parishes, of Ipsden, Newnham Murren and Mongewell. It was made a chapelry in 1849. From 1932 it was divided between Ipsden and Crowmarsh, into which Newnham Murren and Mongewell were merged. In 1952 Stoke Row was made a new civil parish.

Parish church
The Church of England parish church of St John the Evangelist was consecrated in 1846. It was designed in 13th-century style by the architect RC Hussey and is built of knapped flint with stone dressings. The church has a north tower with an octagonal belfry and short spire with a wood shingle roof. The ecclesiastical parish is now a member of The Langtree Team Ministry: a Church of England benefice that also includes the parishes of Checkendon, Ipsden, North Stoke, Whitchurch-on-Thames and Woodcote.

Independent chapel 
There is a history of Dissenters meeting in the village. Dissenters had been meeting in the village since 1691, when they gathered in the drawing room of a local farmhouse. Stoke Row Independent Chapel was built in 1815. It is a simple Georgian building with flint footings and a hipped roof of slate. In 1884 a Sunday school room was built at the back of the chapel. In the early years, services were conducted by visiting ministers or licensed lay preachers, but in 1955 a wealthy local farmer, who had been a lifelong strong supporter, bequeathed a large piece of land opposite the chapel & on this houses were built. The resulting finance enabled a house to be built for the Minister & for chapel modernisation, including modern heating & an extension built in 1956 that includes a kitchen & toilets. A trust was also established & this still provides for the upkeep of the exterior of both buildings. 

In 1978 Padre Bernard Railton Bax took over the ministry. His work was continued, after his death in 1990, by Rev John Harrington and his wife Nina. Mrs Harrington died in 1996 and Rev Harrington retired at the age of 87, after 13 years of service. The chapel has always been independent, but it has neighbourly links with the local Anglican parish church. There was once a move to integrate with the Congregational Church, but the plan did not materialise. The chapel has an ecumenical attitude and residential Ministers in recent years have included those from various church traditions, including Baptist,  Church of the Nazarene and several from a United Reformed Church background.

In June 2015 an outdoor service was held, attended by many villagers, to celebrate the chapel's bicentenary. The congregation sat in a marquee in the chapel grounds and sang hymns with accompaniment from the Reading Central Salvation Army brass band. Rev David and Rev Sonya Jackson gave readings and led prayers, as did Rev Kevin Davies, the minister for Henley deanery. The service was followed by a village picnic. A celebration cake was cut by 95-year-old Ken Jago, the oldest member of the congregation.

Ministers
 1959–65: Pastor Ernest Dickerson
 1967–72: Rev John Potts
 1973–75: Rev Arthur Tilling
 1977–90: Rev Padre Bernard Railton Bax
 1990–2004: Rev John Harrington
 2004–10: Rev David Holmwood
 2010–16: Revs David and Sonia Jackson
 2016– present: Rev Mark Taylor

Maharajah's Well
Edward Anderton Reade, the local squire at Ipsden, had worked with the Maharajah of Benares in India in the mid-nineteenth century. Under Reade's leadership, a well was sunk in 1831 to aid the community in Azamgarh. Reade left the area in 1860, and after his departure, the Maharajah decided to make a contribution to Reade's home area in England. Recalling Reade's help in creating the Azimgurgh well in 1831 and his stories of water deprivation in his home area of Ipsden the Maharajah commissioned the well at Stoke Row and it was sunk in 1863. The Wallingford firm of RJ and H Wilder made the well mechanism in 1863 and completed the pavilion over the well in 1864. The pavilion is open-sided with a cupola on top and a golden-coloured elephant above the well mechanism. The well and pavilion can be seen in a small park on the north side of the main road through Stoke Row village.

Amenities
The village has two 17th-century pubs: the Cherry Tree Inn, a Brakspear tied house and the Crooked Billet a free house. Built in 1642 the pub is reputed to have once been the hideout of highwayman Dick Turpin, who was said to have been romantically attached to the landlord's daughter, Bess. It was England's first gastropub and was the venue for Titanic star Kate Winslet's wedding reception. In June 1989 the British progressive rock band Marillion played its first performance with Steve Hogarth as frontman at the pub; a documentary DVD called From Stoke Row To Ipanema – A Year In The Life was subsequently produced. In the 1851 Census the head of the household at No 1 Stoke Row was George Hope, who built "The Hope" public house. This was later called "The Farmer" and today is Hope House, at the junction of Main Street with Nottwood Lane. The parish has a Church of England primary school.

Notable residents
 George Cole (1925–2015), actor, lived in Stoke Row for more than 70 years.
 Carol Decker (born 1957), former singer of T'Pau, in 2006 became a joint tenant of the Cherry Tree Inn which her husband Richard Coates had established. It closed in 2012, but later reopened under new ownership.
 Nick Heyward (born 1961), singer-songwriter and guitarist, has lived in the village since 2014.

Gallery

References

Sources

External links

 Stoke Row
 Stoke Row C.E. Primary School
 Stoke Row Chapel

Civil parishes in Oxfordshire
Villages in Oxfordshire